111: A Nelson Number is a Bangladeshi supernatural drama television series based on a dorm room numbered 111, where the students living there are spooked by unnatural presence. The series was directed by Nayeem Imtiaz Neyamul, written by Sirajul Islam and produced by Ferdaus. The series, which aired at 9:45 pm on NTV, began on September 27, 2007 and ended after 26 episodes on April 17, 2008.

Cast

References

2000s Bangladeshi television series
Bangladeshi drama television series
Bangladeshi supernatural television shows
Bengali-language television programming in Bangladesh